José Manuel Sánchez Guillén (born 6 June 1996), commonly known as Josema, is a Spanish professional footballer who plays for CD Leganés. Mainly a central defender, he can also play as a left back.

Club career
Born in Lorquí, Murcia, Josema joined UD Almería's youth setup in 2010, aged 14, after stints at ADM Lorquí and Nueva Vanguardia CF. On 14 July 2015, he wa promoted to the former's reserves in Segunda División B.

Josema made his senior debut on 23 August 2015, starting in a 0–0 away draw against FC Jumilla. He scored his first goal on 15 May of the following year, netting his team's third in a 3–3 draw at Mérida AD, as his side was already relegated.

On 6 September 2016, Josema made his first team debut, starting in a 2–0 Copa del Rey home loss against Rayo Vallecano. The following 11 January, he was loaned to Real Murcia until June.

On 2 July 2017, Josema signed a three-year contract with Córdoba CF, for a fee of €500,000. He made his Segunda División debut on 19 August, starting in a 2–1 home loss against Cádiz CF.

On 20 June 2018, after featuring sparingly, Josema was loaned to Ligue 2 side FC Sochaux-Montbéliard for one year, with a buyout clause. His loan was terminated on 29 December, and he moved to Gimnàstic de Tarragona the following 31 January, also in a temporary deal.

On 15 June 2019, after both his loan and parent club suffered relegation, Josema terminated his contract with Córdoba, and signed for Extremadura UD exactly one month later. The following 17 January, he cut ties with the latter, and moved to fellow second division side Elche CF fourteen days later.

On 2 July 2020, after beginning to feature regularly under Pacheta,  agreed to a contract extension until 2022. He contributed with 16 appearances as his side achieved promotion to La Liga.

Josema made his debut in the main category of Spanish football on 26 September 2020, starting in a 3–0 home loss against Real Sociedad. Still a regular starter under new manager Jorge Almirón, he further extended his contract until 2023 on 14 October.

Josema lost his starting spot to new signing Enzo Roco in 2021, and was loaned to second division side Real Valladolid for the remainder of the season on 26 January 2022. On 12 August, he signed a two-year deal with CD Leganés also in the second tier.

Career statistics

Club

References

External links

1996 births
Living people
Footballers from the Region of Murcia
Spanish footballers
Association football defenders
La Liga players
Segunda División players
Segunda División B players
Tercera División players
UD Almería B players
UD Almería players
Real Murcia players
Córdoba CF players
Gimnàstic de Tarragona footballers
Extremadura UD footballers
Elche CF players
Real Valladolid players
CD Leganés players
Ligue 2 players
FC Sochaux-Montbéliard players
Spanish expatriate footballers
Spanish expatriate sportspeople in France
Expatriate footballers in France
Spain youth international footballers